Bolm or BOLM may refer to

 Adolph Rudolphovitch Bolm, dancer and choreographer
 Hermann-Ernst Bolm, member of the Wehrmacht during World War II 
 Kirsten Bolm, German hurdler
 BOLM (also BOLMI), Bread of Life Ministries International